Autiko Waquawuca Daunakamakama is a Fijian former Olympic hurdler. He represented his country in the men's 400 metres hurdles at the 1992 Summer Olympics. His personal best time was 51.81 seconds.

References

External links

1970 births
Living people
Fijian male hurdlers
Olympic athletes of Fiji
Athletes (track and field) at the 1992 Summer Olympics